Varavu Ettana Selavu Pathana is a 1994 Indian Tamil-language comedy drama film directed by V. Sekhar. The film stars Nassar and Raadhika. It was released on 14 April 1994. The film was later remade in Telugu as Aasthi Mooredu Aasha Baaredu (1995) and in Kannada by Sekhar as Hendtheer Darbar (2010).

Plot 

Sivaraman, an honest government clerk, and his wife Lakshmi, belong to a middle-class family and they have two children. "Anjaadha Singam" Marudhapaandi, a corrupt politician, moves into a new house near Sivaraman's house. Marudhapaandi's lifestyle influences Lakshmi, and she tries to ape him by buying luxurious items on installments. This puts pressure on Sivaraman, and he takes a loan from his office peon, but the police arrest him for corruption. He later finds a job in a brandy company with Marudhapaandi's recommendation.

Cast 

Nassar as Sivaraman
Raadhika as Lakshmi
Jaishankar as Valluvardasan
Vadivelu as Peter
Goundamani as Anjatha Singam Marudhapaandi
Senthil as Rahim
Kovai Sarala as Elisabeth
Monica as Padma, Sivaraman's daughter
Master Sirajudeen as Sivaraman's son
Vinu Chakravarthy as MLA
Y. Vijaya as Marudhapaandi's wife
Suryakanth as Marudhapaandi's sidekick
Oru Viral Krishna Rao as House owner
Shanmugasundari as House owner's wife
LIC Narasimhan as Vigilante Officer

Soundtrack 
The soundtrack was composed by Chandrabose, with lyrics written by Vaali.

Reception 
MM of The Indian Express wrote, "A clean family entertainer with Sekhar depending on sound script and deftness in handling it". K. Vijiyan of New Straits Times wrote "This one is for those couples who seem forever stuck in cycle of debts". R. P. R. of Kalki wrote it is a subject suitable for all kinds of audiences; Since Sekhar directed this film it is a same old formula with too many sentiments and teachings.

References

External links 

1990s Tamil-language films
1994 comedy-drama films
1994 films
Films about families
Films directed by V. Sekhar
Films scored by Chandrabose (composer)
Indian comedy-drama films
Tamil films remade in other languages